The 2017 Rallye OiLibya du Maroc was the 18th edition of the Rallye OiLibya du Maroc and was run in Morocco from 4 to 10 October 2017.

Results

Auto
Final rankings after 5 stages on 10 October 2017.

Moto
Final rankings after 5 stages on 10 October 2017.

References

External links
 Rallye du Maroc (3 to 9 October 2018) is a rally raid

Rallye OiLibya du Maroc
OiLibya du Maroc
Rallye OiLibya du Maroc